Dlhá nad Oravou is a village and municipality in Dolný Kubín District in the Žilina Region of northern Slovakia.

See also
 List of municipalities and towns in Slovakia

References

Genealogical resources

The records for genealogical research are available at the state archive "Statny Archiv in Bytca, Slovakia"

 Roman Catholic church records (births/marriages/deaths): 1697-1909 (parish B)

External links
Surnames of living people in Dlha nad Oravou

Villages and municipalities in Dolný Kubín District